Hart House Theatre is a 454-seat theatre in Toronto, Ontario located on the campus of the University of Toronto in the Hart House Student Centre.  The theatre serves the university and the Toronto community at large.

Hart House Theatre opened in November 1919.  Construction was financed by the Massey Foundation.  The first artistic director was Roy Mitchell, who was there for two seasons before resigning over disagreements with the Board of Syndics.  Healey Willan was music director from 1919 to 1925.

The Art Deco theatre has been a starting ground for many well-known actors, directors, playwrights, and designers including: Raymond Massey, Dora Mavor Moore, Lloyd Bochner, Lawren Harris, Arthur Lismer, Wayne and Shuster, and Merrill Denison.

History

Hart House Theatre is often referred to as the cradle of Canadian Theatre. It quickly became a leader in the Canadian "Little Theatre" movement of the 1920s and 1930s.

After World War II, Hart House Theatre, under the direction of Robert Gill, became an extracurricular student theatre and for twenty years turned out a new generation of stage professionals.  William Hutt, Don Harron, Kate Reid, David Gardner, Arthur Hiller, William B. Davis, Donald Sutherland, Norman Jewison and Lorne Michaels all got their start treading the boards on the Hart House stage.

By the mid-1960s the theatre joined the world of academia with the creation of the Graduate Centre for Study of Drama. A new generation of students combined dramatic literature with practical theatre experience and learned from and contributed to the vibrant Toronto theatre scene of the 1970s.

Today Hart House Theatre is the focal point for the performing arts at the University of Toronto. With over a thousand students participating each year in its extra-curricular season of drama, dance, music and film, Hart House Theatre continues to influence each new generation.

References

External links
 Hart House Theatre
 Hart House in The Canadian Encyclopedia
 UofTtix To purchase tickets
Archival papers of Frederick Coates, Art Director of Hart House Theatre in 1923-1924 and 1929–1930, held at the University of Toronto Archives and Records Management Services
Archival papers of Robert Gill, Director of Hart House Theatre, held at the University of Toronto Archives and Records Management Services

University of Toronto buildings
Theatres in Toronto
Art Deco architecture in Canada